Neurotic Records is an independent extreme metal record label specialising predominantly in death metal, operating out of Tilburg in the Netherlands.

History
Neurotic Records was founded in late 2003 by Ruud Lemmen, who was initially responsible for European distribution for the American label Unique Leader before deciding to set up his own label.

In recent years, the label has been seen as an up-and-coming label after a number of relatively high-profile signings of certain bands, especially those signed from the well-respected Unique Leader label.

Neurotic Records is also directly involved in and responsible for the annual death metal festival Neurotic Deathfest, a growing music festival formerly known as the Rotterdam Deathfest - the name being changed to reflect the team behind the organisation of the festival as well as freeing the event up from being tied down to one specific city location.

In mid-2007, the label signed a licensing deal with American label Willowtip to distribute previously unavailable Neurotic Records releases and merchandise for sale in North America, Canada and Mexico. With that the Neurotic Records catalogue is available widely in all of Europe, Australia, New Zealand, the aforementioned countries and more.

List of bands

Current bands 
 Arsebreed
 Disavowed
 Corpus Mortale
 Kronos
 Panzerchrist
 Prostitute Disfigurement
 Ruins
 Visceral Bleeding

Previous bands 
 Fleshgod Apocalypse (now signed to Willowtip Records)
 Psycroptic (now signed to Nuclear Blast Records)
 Sauron (now signed to Folter Records)
 Sickening Horror (now signed to Soulflesh Collector Records)
 Spawn of Possession
 Ulcerate (now signed to Relapse Records)

List of releases 
 Corpus Mortale - With Lewd Demeanor [2003]
 Visceral Bleeding - Transcend Into Ferocity [2004]
 Sauron - For A Dead Race [2004]
 Visceral Bleeding - Remnants Revived [2005]
 Prostitute Disfigurement - Left In Grisly Fashion [2005]
 Ruins - Spun Forth As Dark Nets [2005]
 Arsebreed - Munching The Rotten [2005]
 Psycroptic - Symbols Of Failure [2006]
 Spawn of Possession - Noctambulant [2006]
 Panzerchrist - Battalion Beast [2006]
 Ulcerate - Of Fracture And Failure [2006]
 Visceral Bleeding - Absorbing The Disarray [2007]
 Disavowed - Stagnated Existence [2007]
 Sickening Horror - When Landscapes Bled Backwards [2007]
 Corpus Mortale - A New Species Of Deviant [2007]
 Prostitute Disfigurement - Descendants Of Depravity [2008]

References

Dutch record labels